The following are the national records in athletics in Estonia maintained by Estonia's national athletics federation: Eesti Kergejõustikuliit (EKJL).

Outdoor

Key to tables:

+ = en route to a longer distance

h = hand timing

Men

Women

Mixed

Indoor

Men

Women

Mixed

See also
List of Baltic records in athletics

Notes

References
General
Estonian records 6 February 2023 updated
Specific

External links
EKJL web site 
Estonian all-time lists

Estonia
Athletics
Athletics
Records